Ankahi is an Urdu television drama serial broadcast by PTV in 1982 as is now considered as a cult-classic. It was written by Haseena Moin and directed by Shoaib Mansoor and Mohsin Ali.

The drama serial featured an ensemble star cast including Shehnaz Sheikh, Shakeel, Javed Sheikh, Saleem Nasir, Jamshed Ansari, Behroze Sabzwari, Badar Khalil, Qazi Wajid, Azra Mansoor, Khalid Nizami, Arshad Mehmood, Tabassum Farooqui and Faisal Bilal. Ankahi was one of the most popular drama serial in the early 1980s in Pakistan.

This cast had then went on to work in a similar Pakistani drama serial Tanhaiyaan in 1986. Ankahi is remembered for its witty dialogue and the candid role of Sana (Shehnaz Sheikh). The show was not only popular in the Pakistan but across the border as well. In 2020, PTV Home retelecast it daily from 18th Of April to 2 May, in PTV GOLD Hour.

Synopsis
The story revolves around a young ambitious girl Sana Murad (Shehnaz Sheikh). Due to her father's early death, her family is not so well-off and she dreams of being rich and prosperous like her friend Sara (Misbah Khalid). Her younger brother Jibran has a hole in his heart and they need money for his operation or surgery as well. Hence she applies for a job at an office. She fails the job interview as she is a fresh graduate and lacks the experience and qualifications required, but on her way back, meets the chairman Mr. Siddiqui (Qazi Wajid) who offers her the job anyway. She begins working for the Managing Director of the company Taimur Ahmad (Yousaf Kamal). Sana is extremely clumsy, irresponsible and does not even know how to type or take dictations which causes Taimur great problems and some hilarious situations for the viewers. At her friend Sara's wedding, her groom Sajjad (Arshad Mehmood)'s best friend Faraz (Javed Sheikh) falls for Sana and starts following her everywhere. He even goes to her office and ends up getting a job there, only to be closer to Sana.

Meanwhile her aunt Zakia (Badar Khalil) arrives from America with her son Moby (Behroze Sabzwari) for a visit. Since her mamu (Saleem Nasir) had written to her that they have become rich, they pretend to be rich even to the extent of convincing their neighbor Timmy (Jamshed Ansari) to act as their butler. After many hilarious antics, the truth is finally revealed and Zakia decides to buy a big house for all to move in. Meanwhile Moby falls in love with Marium (daughter of their tenant). After Moby's insistence, Zakia accepts his marriage with Marium. Jibran becomes friends with Faraz as he frequently comes to their house to see Sana. Sana's family start liking Faraz and Sajjad talks with them for the arrangement of Faraz's marriage with Sana. Jibran goes to the U.S. with his mother for a successful heart operation and returns.

Meanwhile Sana gets close to Taimur whose wife Abeer is in a coma and he is looking for happiness with Sana. Taimur, however, accepts his own mistakes and Sana, feeling guilty, resigns from the job. Taimur goes to her home to tell her that she should move on and comes to realize Faraz's love for Sana and tells her that there are 'unsaid' (Ankahi) things that he couldn't say to her and departs. Abeer dies during a surgery, Sana & Faraz go to Taimur's home for condolences. Faraz leaves Taimur's home expecting Sana to go for Taimur but she unexpectedly wants to leave with him reassuring him of her consent for him.

Cast
 Shehnaz Sheikh as Sana Murad
 Faisal Bilal as Jibran Murad
 Shakeel as Taimoor Ahmad
 Javed Sheikh as Faraz Aafreedi
 Badar Khalil as Zakia Begum
 Saleem Nasir as Shehryar
 Jamshed Ansari as Tameez ud din, Timmy
 Qazi Wajid as Siddiqui Sahib
 Behroze Sabzwari as Moby
 Tabassum Farooqi as Maryam
 Azra Mansoor as Apa Bi
 Misbah Ishaaq as Saira
 Arshad Mehmood as Sajjad

Accolades

Adaptations
The teledrama was adapted into a Theater play titled Ankahi 2020 and premiered on 25 March 2020 at the Karachi Arts Council in which lead role of Sana Murad was played by Amna Ilyas.

2000's Bollywood movie Chal Mere Bhai, unofficial remake of the serial, was loosely based on the series and had the same storyline as of the serial.

References

External links
 

Pakistani drama television series
Urdu-language television shows
Pakistani television series
Pakistan Television Corporation original programming
Television shows set in Karachi
Nigar Award winners
Pakistani comedy television series